The 1948 Tour de Romandie was the second edition of the Tour de Romandie cycle race and was held from 6 June to 9 June 1948. The race started and finished in Geneva. The race was won by Ferdinand Kübler.

General classification

References

1948
Tour de Romandie